DHI is an international water software development and engineering consultancy firm with headquarters in Denmark. The not-for-profit organisation addresses all challenges in water environments through consultancy services, MIKE Powered by DHI water modelling software, business applications, data portals and operational services. DHI has 30 offices throughout the world, with software development centres in Singapore and Denmark, and approximately 1050 employees.

DHI takes its name from the acronym Dansk Hydraulisk Institut (Danish Hydraulic Institute), founded in 1964 by the Technical University of Denmark as Vandbygningsinstituttet (The Institute of Water Production). After merging with Vandkvalitetsinstituttet (The Institute for Water Quality) in 2000 and the Dansk Toksikologi Center (Danish Toxicology Centre) in 2005, the organisation simplified its name to DHI.

MIKE Powered by DHI software
The MIKE suite of software are tools for modelling water environments. Its application areas include Water Resources, Coast and Sea, Cities, and Groundwater & Porous Media.

Integrated Platforms 

 MIKE+: Integrate and model collection systems, distribution networks, rivers and flooding
 MIKE Cloud: Modelling apps, scalable computing, limitless storage and powerful collaboration abilities

Water Resources 

 MIKE HYDRO River: Comprehensive river network modelling
 MIKE SHE: Integrated catchment modelling
 MIKE HYDRO Basin: River basin management and planning
 MIKE 21C: River hydraulics and morphology

Coast and Sea 

 MIKE 21: 2D modelling of coast and sea
 MIKE 3: 3D modelling of coast and sea
 LITPACK: Littoral processes and coastline kinetics
 ABM Lab: Agent-based modelling

Cities 

 MIKE+: Integrate and model collection systems, distribution networks, rivers and flooding
MIKE WaterNet Advisor: Hydraulic network conditions at your fingertips
 WEST: Modelling and simulation of wastewater treatment plants
 DIMS.CORE: Data integration and business processes

Groundwater and Porous Media 

 FEFLOW: All-in-one groundwater modelling solution

General 

 MIKE FLOOD: Urban, coastal and riverine flooding
 MIKE ECO Lab: Ecological modelling made simple
 MIKE OPERATIONS: Supporting the data transformation process for water professionals

Additional tools 

 MIKE ANIMATOR PLUS: Animated presentations of model results
 MIKE C-MAP: Model bathymetries made fast and easy

Business Applications: One-stop solutions for your water challenges 
Plan new flood protection measures, assess beach design ideas, forecast oil spills, manage a vessel’s biosecurity risk and more with specialised applications that truly put the power in your hands.

 ClimADAPT
 Coastal Screener
 FloodRisk
 GlobalSEA Oil Spill
 MUSE
 NatCatEye
 PlumeCast
 Vessel-Check

Data Portals: On-demand data for water environments 
Support your projects with easy access to high-quality water depth, metocean and marine animal movement data whenever you need it.

 MetOcean Data Portal
 Marine Animal Movement Portal
 Bathymetrics Data Portal
Global Hydrological Model
Current Sea API

Operational Services: Real-time optimisation and management platform customised for your business 
Make critical water-related decisions in real-time to optimise planning, operations and control through the powerful integration of data collection, analytics and modelling technology.

 SeaPort OPX: Digital operational services for ports
MIKE MINE: Cloud-based mine water management tool
TwinPlant: Digital twin of wastewater treatment plants
 Future City Flow: Online service for optimal wastewater systems planning, operation and control

Free e-Books

 Shoreline Management Guidelines
 Water Resources Management in a Changing Climate

Case stories 
Read more about our projects

Social media 

 Website
 LinkedIn
 Facebook
 Blog

References

Engineering companies of Denmark
Software companies of Denmark
Danish companies established in 2000
Software companies established in 2000